Pahoia is a waterfront settlement in the Western Bay of Plenty District and Bay of Plenty Region of New Zealand's North Island.

It includes a stretch of State Highway 2 that is a common crash site, due to windy roads, high speeds and heavy traffic. The New Zealand Transport Agency has reduced speeds along the road following a series of crashes, including introducing a school speed zone outside Pahoia School.

Pahoia Domain, a beach and park, is the base for an mud challenge fundraiser for Tauranga Boys' College rugby teams. The course includes 6km of mudflats along the Pahoia waterfront.

Demographics
Pahoia is in two SA1 statistical areas which cover . The SA1 areas are part of the larger Pahoia statistical area.

Pahoia had a population of 288 at the 2018 New Zealand census, an increase of 48 people (20.0%) since the 2013 census, and an increase of 30 people (11.6%) since the 2006 census. There were 120 households, comprising 147 males and 147 females, giving a sex ratio of 1.0 males per female, with 57 people (19.8%) aged under 15 years, 30 (10.4%) aged 15 to 29, 156 (54.2%) aged 30 to 64, and 48 (16.7%) aged 65 or older.

Ethnicities were 99.0% European/Pākehā, 8.3% Māori, 1.0% Pacific peoples, and 3.1% Asian. People may identify with more than one ethnicity.

Although some people chose not to answer the census's question about religious affiliation, 58.3% had no religion, 30.2% were Christian, 1.0% were Hindu and 2.1% had other religions.

Of those at least 15 years old, 57 (24.7%) people had a bachelor's or higher degree, and 18 (7.8%) people had no formal qualifications. 54 people (23.4%) earned over $70,000 compared to 17.2% nationally. The employment status of those at least 15 was that 120 (51.9%) people were employed full-time, 51 (22.1%) were part-time, and 3 (1.3%) were unemployed.

Pahoia statistical area

The statistical area had a population of 3,198 at the 2018 New Zealand census, an increase of 528 people (19.8%) since the 2013 census, and an increase of 558 people (21.1%) since the 2006 census. There were 1,161 households, comprising 1,623 males and 1,572 females, giving a sex ratio of 1.03 males per female. The median age was 45.6 years (compared with 37.4 years nationally), with 648 people (20.3%) aged under 15 years, 417 (13.0%) aged 15 to 29, 1,662 (52.0%) aged 30 to 64, and 468 (14.6%) aged 65 or older.

Ethnicities were 94.1% European/Pākehā, 11.7% Māori, 1.5% Pacific peoples, 1.5% Asian, and 1.6% other ethnicities. People may identify with more than one ethnicity.

The percentage of people born overseas was 19.9, compared with 27.1% nationally.

Although some people chose not to answer the census's question about religious affiliation, 58.0% had no religion, 29.4% were Christian, 0.7% had Māori religious beliefs, 0.4% were Hindu, 0.7% were Buddhist and 2.1% had other religions.

Of those at least 15 years old, 570 (22.4%) people had a bachelor's or higher degree, and 339 (13.3%) people had no formal qualifications. The median income was $35,900, compared with $31,800 nationally. 534 people (20.9%) earned over $70,000 compared to 17.2% nationally. The employment status of those at least 15 was that 1,308 (51.3%) people were employed full-time, 501 (19.6%) were part-time, and 63 (2.5%) were unemployed.

Education

The school opened in 1927.

The school holds an annual triathlon.

References

Western Bay of Plenty District
Populated places in the Bay of Plenty Region
Populated places around the Tauranga Harbour